Thomas Hermann Geisser (born February 28, 1966, in Wuppertal) is a German mathematician working at 
Rikkyo University (Tokyo, Japan). He works in the field of arithmetic geometry, motivic cohomology and algebraic K-theory.

Education 
From 1985 Geisser studied at Bonn University under the supervision of Günther Harder and obtained a master's degree in 1990. He continued to obtain a Ph.D. under the supervision of Christopher Deninger at the University of Münster; the title of his thesis is A p-adic analog of Beilinson's conjecture for Hecke characters of imaginary quadratic fields.

Career
Geisser spent three years at Harvard University as a visiting scholar and visiting fellow, respectively. After further stays in Essen, University of Illinois, Urbana-Champaign and Tokyo University, he became Assistant Professor at the University of Southern California, and was promoted to Associate Professor in 2002 and Professor in 2006.

After visiting Tokyo University again he became professor at Nagoya University in 2010, and moved to 
Rikkyo University in 2015

He received a Sloan Research Fellowship (2000) and a Humboldt Prize (2021).

He is editor for Documenta Mathematica and managing editor for Commentarii Mathematici Universitatis St.Pauli.

Selected publications

References

External links 
Homepage Rikkyo

20th-century German mathematicians
21st-century German mathematicians
1966 births
Academic staff of Rikkyo University
Academic staff of Nagoya University
University of Southern California faculty
Living people